Large-scale killings and civil unrest primarily targeting members of the Communist Party (PKI) were carried out in Indonesia from 1965 to 1966. Other affected groups included communist sympathisers, Gerwani women, ethnic Javanese Abangan, ethnic Chinese, atheists, alleged "unbelievers", and alleged leftists. It is estimated that between 500,000 to 1,000,000 people were killed during the main period of violence from October 1965 to March 1966. The atrocities, sometimes described as a genocide or politicide, were instigated by the Indonesian Army under Suharto. Research and declassified documents demonstrate the Indonesian authorities received support from foreign countries such as the United States and the United Kingdom. 

It began as an anti-communist purge following a controversial attempted coup d'état by the 30 September Movement. According to the most widely published estimates at least 500,000 to 1.2 million people were killed, with some estimates going as high as two to three million. The purge was a pivotal event in the transition to the "New Order" and the elimination of PKI as a political force, with impacts on the global Cold War. The upheavals led to the fall of President Sukarno and the commencement of Suharto's three-decade authoritarian presidency.

The abortive coup attempt released pent-up communal hatreds in Indonesia; these were fanned by the Indonesian Army, which quickly blamed the PKI. Additionally, the intelligence agencies of the United States, United Kingdom and Australia engaged in black propaganda campaigns against Indonesian communists. During the Cold War, the United States, its government, and its Western allies had the goal of halting the spread of communism and bringing countries into the sphere of Western Bloc influence. Britain had additional reasons for seeking Sukarno's removal, as his government was involved in an undeclared war with the neighbouring Federation of Malaya, a Commonwealth federation of former British colonies.

Communists were purged from political, social, and military life, and the PKI itself was disbanded and banned. Mass killings began in October 1965, in the weeks following the coup attempt, and reached their peak over the remainder of the year before subsiding in the early months of 1966. They started in the capital, Jakarta, and spread to Central and East Java, and later Bali. Thousands of local vigilantes and Army units killed actual and alleged PKI members. Killings occurred across the country, with the most intense in the PKI strongholds of Central Java, East Java, Bali, and northern Sumatra. 

It is possible that over one million suspected PKI members and alleged communist sympathizers were imprisoned at one time or another. Sukarno's balancing act of "Nasakom" (nationalism, religion, and communism) unravelled. His most significant pillar of support, the PKI, was effectively eliminated by the other two pillars—the Army and political Islam; and the Army was on the way to gaining unchallenged power. In March 1967, Sukarno was stripped of his remaining authority by Indonesia's provisional parliament, and Suharto was named Acting President. In March 1968, Suharto was formally elected president.

The killings are skipped over in most Indonesian history textbooks and have received little attention by Indonesians due to their suppression under the Suharto regime, as well as receiving little international attention. The search for satisfactory explanations for the scale and frenzy of the violence has challenged scholars from all ideological perspectives. The possibility of returning to similar upheavals is cited as a factor in the "New Order" administration's political conservatism and tight control of the political system. Vigilance and stigma against a perceived communist threat remained a hallmark of Suharto's doctrine, and it is still in force even today.

Despite a consensus at the highest levels of the U.S. and British governments that it would be necessary "to liquidate Sukarno", as related in a CIA memorandum from 1962, and the existence of extensive contacts between anti-communist army officers and the U.S. military establishment – training of over 1,200 officers, "including senior military figures", and providing weapons and economic assistance – the CIA denied active involvement in the killings. Declassified U.S. documents in 2017 revealed that the U.S. government had detailed knowledge of the mass killings from the beginning and was supportive of the actions of the Indonesian Army. U.S. complicity in the killings, which included providing extensive lists of PKI officials to Indonesian death squads, has previously been established by historians and journalists. 

A top-secret CIA report from 1968 stated that the massacres "rank as one of the worst mass murders of the 20th century, along with the Soviet purges of the 1930s, the Nazi mass murders during the Second World War, and the Maoist bloodbath of the early 1950s."

Background 

Support for Sukarno's presidency under his "Guided Democracy" depended on his forced and unstable "Nasakom" coalition between the military, religious groups, and communists. The rise in influence and increasing militancy of the Communist Party of Indonesia (PKI), and Sukarno's support for it, was a serious concern for Muslims and the military, and tension grew steadily in the early and mid-1960s. The third-largest communist party in the world, the PKI had approximately 300,000 cadres and full membership of around two million. The party's assertive efforts to speed up land reform frightened those who controlled the land and threatened the social position of Muslim clerics. Sukarno required government employees to study his Nasakom principles as well as Marxist theory. He had met with Zhou Enlai, Premier of the People's Republic of China, and after this meeting had decided to create a militia, called a Fifth Force, which he intended to control personally. Sukarno ordered weapons from China to equip this Fifth Force. He declared in a speech that he favoured revolutionary groups whether they were nationalist, religious or communist, stating, "I am a friend of the Communists because the Communists are revolutionary people." He said at a Non-Aligned Movement summit meeting in Cairo in October 1964 that his current purpose was to drive all of Indonesian politics to the left and thereby to neutralise the "reactionary" elements in the Army that could be dangerous for the revolution. Sukarno's international policies increasingly reflected his rhetoric.

Sukarno hosted the Bandung Conference in 1955 (in Bandung, Indonesia). It was a conference of mostly former colonised countries throughout Asia and Africa (including China, North Vietnam, Laos, and Cambodia). The conference was the predecessor to the Non-Aligned Movement and was not a communist convention. However, this was enough for the U.S. to be very suspicious of Sukarno and suspect him of deep communist sympathies.

The PKI became very popular in Indonesia and performed better and better in elections throughout the 1950s. They were less corrupt than other political parties and followed through on their promises.

As early as 1958, Western powers—in particular the U.S. and the U.K.—pushed for policies that would encourage the Indonesian Army to act forcefully against the PKI and the Left, which included a covert propaganda campaign designed to damage the reputation of Sukarno and the PKI, and secret assurances along with military and financial support to anti-communist leaders within the Army. The U.S. Central Intelligence Agency (CIA) considered assassinating Sukarno and selected an "asset" to do the job, but instead produced a porn video with an actor portraying Sukarno and a Soviet flight attendant to delegitimise him and paint him as a communist. However, the video was not released because the agency could not put together a convincing enough film.

30 September 
On the evening of 30 September 1965, a group of militants, known as the 30 September Movement, captured and executed six of Indonesia's top military generals. The movement proclaimed itself as Sukarno's protectors, issuing a pre-emptive strike to prevent a possible coup by the "anti-Sukarno", pro-Western Council of Generals.

Following the execution, the movement's forces occupied Merdeka Square in Jakarta and the presidential palace. Shortly afterwards, however, President Sukarno refused to commit to the movement, for it had captured and assassinated many of his top generals. As the night continued, its poor leadership began to show, starting with a series of incoherent radio messages. The movement mainly aimed to occupy the main telecommunications building; however, it ignored the east side of the square, which was the location of Kostrad, the armed forces strategic reserve. At the time, Major General Suharto was in control of the reserve, and upon hearing the news of the takeover, he quickly capitalised on the movement's weaknesses, regaining control of the square without resistance. Following the surrender, the movement's troops did not take further action. At the same time, the Indonesian military slowly gained influence as Sukarno's waned, and within days, the government was under the control of Suharto. He immediately deployed troops and dispersed the movement while trumpeting the movement's actions as a "danger" to the nation.

A military propaganda campaign to link the coup attempt with the PKI, masterminded by Suharto and the military, began to sweep the country on 5 October. (the Armed Forces Day and the day of the six generals' state funeral). Graphic images and descriptions of the murdered, tortured, and even castrated generals began to circulate the country. The campaign was successful despite falsified information, convincing both Indonesian and international audiences that the murders were a PKI attempt to undermine the government under President Sukarno. Though the PKI denied involvement, pent-up tension and hatred that had built up over the years were released.

Even though the 30 September Movement killed 12 people, Suharto ultimately presented it as a nationwide conspiracy to commit mass murder. Millions of people associated with the PKI, even illiterate peasants from remote villages, were presented as murderers and accomplices of the movement. Already in early 1966, two Indonesian specialists at Cornell University, Benedict Anderson and Ruth McVey, observed in their Cornell Paper that Suharto's Army began the anti-communist campaign well after the 30 September Movement had collapsed. Between the moment that the movement ended and the moment that the Army's mass arrests began, three weeks had elapsed in which no violence or trace of civil war occurred, even according to the Army itself. Sukarno constantly protested the purge, stating that the Army was "burning down a house to kill a rat", but he was powerless as Suharto commanded a firm hold on the military.

Political purge 
The Army removed top civilian and military leaders it thought sympathetic to the PKI. The parliament and cabinet were purged of Sukarno loyalists. Leading PKI members were immediately arrested, some summarily executed. Army leaders organised demonstrations in Jakarta during which on 8 October, the PKI Jakarta headquarters was burned down. Anti-Communist youth groups were formed, including the Army-backed Indonesian Students' Action Front (KAMI), the Indonesian Youth and Students' Action Front (KAPPI), and the Indonesian University Alumni Action Front (KASI). In Jakarta and West Java, over 10,000 PKI activists and leaders were arrested, including famed novelist Pramoedya Ananta Toer.

The initial deaths occurred during organised clashes between the Army and the PKI, including some Indonesian armed forces units who were sympathetic to communism and were resisting General Suharto's crackdown. For example, much of the Marine Corps, the Air Force, and the Police Mobile Brigade Corps were infiltrated up to commander level by the PKI. In early October, forces of the Strategic Command (Suharto's Kostrad) and the RPKAD para-commandos led by Colonel Sarwo Edhie Wibowo were sent to Central Java, a region with strong PKI support, while troops of uncertain loyalty were ordered out. At the same time, the Siliwangi Division was deployed to guard Jakarta and West Java, both of which, unlike Central and East Java, remained relatively immune to the mass killings. Early fighting in the Central Java highlands and around Madiun suggested the PKI might be able to establish a rival regime centred on these regions. However, widespread fears of a civil war between factions supported by the United States and China, respectively, quickly evaporated as the forces sent by Suharto took control. Many rebel commanders chose not to fight as Suharto-deployed forces arrived, although resistance came from some, like General Supardjo, for a few more weeks.

As the Sukarno presidency began to unravel and Suharto began to assert control following the coup attempt, the PKI's top national leadership was hunted and arrested, with some summarily executed. In early October, PKI chairman Dipa Nusantara Aidit had flown to Central Java, where the coup attempt had been supported by leftist officers in Yogyakarta, Salatiga, and Semarang. Fellow senior PKI leader Njoto was shot around 6 November, Aidit on 22 November, and First Deputy PKI Chairman M.H. Lukman was killed shortly after that.

Massacres 

The killings started in October 1965 in Jakarta, spread to Central and Eastern Java and later to Bali, and smaller outbreaks occurred in parts of other islands, including Sumatra. The communal tensions and bitter hatreds that had built up were played upon by the Army leadership, which characterised Communists as villains, and many Indonesian civilians took part in the killings. The worst massacres were in Aceh, Bali, Central and East Java where PKI support was at its strongest. The situation varied across the country, and the role of the Army has never been fully explained. In some areas, the Army organised, encouraged, trained, and supplied civilian groups and local militias. In other areas, communal vigilante action preceded the Army, although in most cases, killings did not commence before military units had sanctioned violence by instruction or example. It was in the earlier stages of the killings that the Army's direct involvement in clashes with the PKI occurred. By the end of October, groups of devout Muslims joined the purge of Communists, claiming it was their duty to cleanse Indonesia of atheism.

In some areas, civilian militia knew where to find known Communists and their sympathisers, while in others, the Army demanded lists of Communists from village heads. There was no disguise associated with PKI membership, and most suspects were easy to identify within communities. The U.S. Embassy in Jakarta supplied the Indonesian military with lists of up to 5,000 suspected Communists. Although some PKI branches organised resistance and reprisal killings, most went passively to their deaths. Not all victims were PKI members. Often the label "PKI" was used to include anyone to the left of the Indonesian National Party (PNI). In other cases, victims were suspected or simply alleged Communists or were victims of grievance settling with little or no political motive. Anti-Communist killings were then instigated with youths, assisted by the Army. Most of the victims were not major political figures and were mostly among the poor and the lower middle-class such as farmers, plantation labourers, factory workers, students, teachers, artists and civil servants. They were often targeted because they or someone they knew, such as a friend or family member, had joined the PKI or affiliated organisation.

With very few exceptions, the killings were not spontaneous but carried out with a high degree of organisation. Most of the victims were also detainees of the Indonesian Army, making the killings summary executions. Initially, many leftists willingly turned themselves in to the military and the police, believing they would be safe and, therefore, the reasonable thing to do.  The killings were carried out 'face to face' as in Rwanda or Cambodia, unlike the mechanical methods of killing used by Nazi Germany. The methods of non-mechanised violence and killing included shooting, dismembering alive, stabbing, disembowelment, castration, impaling, strangling and beheading with Japanese-style samurai swords. Firearms and automatic weapons were used on a limited scale, with most of the killings being carried out with knives, sickles, machetes, swords, ice picks, bamboo spears, iron rods and other makeshift weapons. Islamic extremists often paraded severed heads on spikes. Corpses were often thrown into rivers, and at one point, officials complained to the Army of congested rivers that run into the city of Surabaya due to the bodies. In areas such as Kediri in East Java, Nahdlatul Ulama youth wing (Ansor Youth Movement) members lined up Communists, cut their throats and disposed of the bodies in rivers. Rows of severed penises were often left behind as a reminder to the rest. The killings left whole sections of villages empty, and the houses of victims or the interned were looted and often handed over to the military.

Local Chinese Indonesians were killed in some areas, and their properties looted and burned as a result of anti-Chinese racism, on the excuse that D.N. Aidit had brought the PKI closer to China. In the predominantly Christian islands of Nusa Tenggara, Christian clergy and teachers suffered at the hands of Muslim youth.

Although there were occasional and isolated flare-ups until 1969, the killings mostly subsided by March 1966, when either there were no more suspects or authorities intervened. Solo residents said that exceptionally high flooding in March 1966 of the Solo River, considered mystical by the Javanese, signalled the end of the killings.

Java 

In Java, much of the killing was along aliran (cultural stream) loyalties; the Army encouraged santri (more devout and orthodox Muslims) among the Javanese to seek out PKI members among the abangan (less orthodox) Javanese. The conflict that had broken out in 1963 between the Muslim party Nahdlatul Ulama (NU) and the PKI turned into killings in the second week of October. The Muslim group Muhammadiyah proclaimed in early November 1965 that the extermination of "Gestapu/PKI" constituted Holy War ("Gestapu" being the military's name for the "30 September Movement"), a position that was supported by other Islamic groups in Java and Sumatra. For many youths, killing Communists became a religious duty. Where there had been Communist centres in Central and East Java, Muslim groups portraying themselves as victims of Communist aggression justified the killings by evoking the Madiun Affair of 1948. Roman Catholic students in the Yogyakarta region left their hostels at night to join in the execution of truckloads of arrested Communists.

Although the killings subsided in early 1966 for most of the country, they went on for years in parts of East Java. In Blitar, guerrilla action was maintained by surviving PKI members until they were defeated in 1967 and 1968. The mystic Mbah Suro, along with devotees of his Communist-infused traditional mysticism, built an army, but he and his 80 followers were killed in a war of resistance against the Indonesian Army.

Bali 
Mirroring the widening of social divisions across Indonesia in the 1950s and early 1960s, the island of Bali saw conflict between supporters of the traditional Balinese caste system and those rejecting these traditional values, particularly the PKI. Communists were publicly accused of working towards destroying the island's culture, religion, and character, and the Balinese, like the Javanese, were urged to destroy the PKI. Government jobs, funds, business advantage and other spoils of office had gone to the Communists during the final years of Sukarno's presidency. Disputes over land and tenants' rights led to land seizures and killings when the PKI promoted "unilateral action". As Indonesia's only Hindu-majority island, Bali did not have the Islamic forces involved in Java, and it was upper-caste PNI landlords who instigated the elimination of PKI members. High Hindu priests called for sacrifices to satisfy spirits angered by past sacrilege and social disruption. Balinese Hindu leader Ida Bagus Oka told Hindus: "There can be no doubt [that] the enemies of our revolution are also the cruellest enemies of religion, and must be eliminated and destroyed down to the roots." Like parts of East Java, Bali experienced a state of near civil war as Communists regrouped.

The balance of power was shifted in favour of anti-Communists in December 1965, when personnel from both the Army Para-commando Regiment and 5th Brawijaya Military Region units arrived in Bali after having carried out killings in Java. Led by Suharto's principal troubleshooter, Sarwo Edhie Wibowo, Javanese military commanders permitted Balinese squads to kill until reined in. In contrast to Central Java, where the Army encouraged people to kill the "Gestapu", Bali's eagerness to kill was so tremendous and spontaneous that, having provided logistic support initially, the Army eventually had to step in to prevent chaos. Sukarno's choice of Bali's provincial governor, Suteja, was recalled from office and accused of preparing a communist uprising, and his relatives were tracked down and killed. A series of killings similar to those in Central and East Java were led by black-shirted PNI youth. For several months, militia death squads went through villages capturing suspects and taking them away. Hundreds of houses belonging to communists and their relatives were burnt down within one week of the reprisal crusade, with occupants being butchered as they ran from their homes. An early estimate suggested that 50,000 people, including women and children, were killed in this operation alone. The population of several Balinese villages were halved in the last months of 1965. All the Chinese shops in the towns of Singaraja and Denpasar were destroyed, and many of their owners who were alleged to have financially supported the "Gestapu" killed. Between December 1965 and early 1966, an estimated 80,000 Balinese were killed, roughly 5% of the island's population at the time, and proportionally more than anywhere else in Indonesia.

Other islands 
PKI-organised movements and campaigns against foreign businesses in Sumatra's plantations provoked quick reprisals against communists following the coup attempt. In Aceh, as many as 40,000 were killed, part of the possibly 200,000 deaths across Sumatra. Ethnic Javanese migrants were slaughtered en masse in South Sumatra. The regional revolts of the late 1950s complicated events in Sumatra as many former rebels were forced to affiliate themselves with Communist organisations to prove their loyalty to the Indonesian Republic. The quelling of the 1950s revolts and 1965 killings were seen by most Sumatrans as a "Javanese occupation". In Lampung, another factor in the killings seems to have been Javanese immigration. In West Kalimantan, after the killings ended in 1967, indigenous pagan Dayaks expelled 45,000 ethnic Chinese from rural areas, killing as many as 2,000 to 5,000. The Chinese refused to fight back since they considered themselves "a guest on other people's land" with the intention of trading only.

Religious and ethnic factors 
Islam in Java was divided between Abangan, who mixed Islam with other religions like Hinduism and native religious practices, and the Santri, who followed standard orthodox Islam. Many Abangans were supporters of the Communist Party, and their interests were thus supported by the PKI. They subsequently made up most of the people who were slaughtered in the killings. Abangans were targeted for attacks by Ansor, the youth wing of Nahdlatul Ulama and the Santri with help from the Indonesian Army. To avoid being classified as atheist and communists, Abangan Muslims were forced by the Indonesian government to convert to Hinduism and Christianity in the aftermath of the slaughter.

In Sumatra, anti-Javanese Sumatran youths massacred the ethnic Javanese plantation labourers and PKI members throughout North Sumatra. In Lombok, natives slaughtered mostly ethnic Balinese all across the region.

The targeting of ethnic Chinese played an important role in the killings in Sumatra and Kalimantan, which have been called genocide. Charles A. Coppel is sharply critical of this characterisation, in which he sees a western media and academics unwilling to face the consequences of an anti-communist agenda that they endorsed, instead scapegoating Indonesian racism and indulging in extravagant and false claims of hundreds of thousands or millions of Chinese killed. Charles Coppel wrote of the distorted coverage in an article titled: "A genocide that never was: explaining the myth of anti-Chinese massacres in Indonesia, 1965–1966". Coppel sees the same bias in coverage of the May 1998 riots, where the Volunteer Team for Humanity noted non-Chinese looters made up the majority of those who were killed. His thesis continues to inspire debate.

An estimate is that around 2,000 Chinese Indonesians were killed (out of a total estimated death toll of between 500,000 and 3 million people), with documented massacres taking place in Makassar, Medan and Lombok island. Robert Cribb and Charles A. Coppel noted that "relatively few" Chinese were actually killed during the purge while most of the dead were native Indonesians. The death toll of the Chinese was in the thousands, while the death toll of native Indonesians was in the hundreds of thousands. Ethnic Balinese and Javanese made up the vast majority of people who were massacred.

Deaths and imprisonment 
Although the general outline of events is known, much is unknown about the killings, and an accurate and verified count of the dead is unlikely ever to be known. There were few Western journalists or academics in Indonesia at the time; the military was one of the few sources of information, travel was difficult and dangerous, and the regime that approved and oversaw the killings remained in power for three decades. The Indonesian media at the time had been undermined by restrictions under "Guided Democracy" and by the "New Order's" takeover in October 1966. With the killings occurring at the height of Western fears over communism during the Cold War, there was little investigation internationally, which would have risked complicating the West's preference for Suharto and the "New Order" over the PKI and the "Old Order".

In the first 20 years following the killings, 39 serious estimates of the death toll were attempted. Before the killings had finished, the Indonesian Army estimated 78,500 had been killed, while the PKI put the figure at two million. The Indonesian Army later estimated the number killed to be one million. In 1966, Benedict Anderson had set the death toll at 200,000. By 1985 he concluded that a total of 500,000 to 1 million people had been killed. Most scholars now agree that at least half a million were killed, thus more than in any other event in Indonesian history. An armed forces security command estimate from December 1976 put the number at between 450,000 and 500,000. Robert Cribb suggests the most accurate figure is 500,000, though he notes it is incredibly difficult to determine the precise number of people killed. However, Jan Walendouw, one of Suharto's confidants, admitted that about 1.2 million Indonesians were killed. Vincent Bevins estimates the numbers killed at up to a million or perhaps more.

Arrests and imprisonment continued for ten years after the purge. A 1977 Amnesty International report suggested "about one million" PKI cadres and others identified or suspected of party involvement were detained. Between 1981 and 1990, the Indonesian government estimated that there were between 1.6 and 1.8 million former prisoners "at large" in society. It is possible that in the mid-1970s, 100,000 were still imprisoned without trial. It is thought that as many as 1.5 million were imprisoned at one stage or another. Those PKI members not killed or imprisoned went into hiding while others tried to hide their past. Those arrested included leading politicians, artists and writers such as Pramoedya Ananta Toer, and peasants and soldiers. 

Those incarcerated in the vast network of prisons and concentration camps, which rivalled the worst camps of the USSR, faced "extraordinarily inhumane conditions." Many did not survive this first period of detention, dying from malnutrition and beatings. 

As people revealed the names of underground Communists, often under torture, the numbers imprisoned rose from 1966–68. Methods of torture included severe beatings with makeshift materials like electric cable and large pieces of wood, breaking fingers and crushing toes and feet under the legs of tables and chairs, pulling out fingernails, electric shocks, and burning with molten rubber or cigarettes. Detainees were sometimes forced to watch or listen to the torture of others, including relatives such as spouses or children. Both men and women were subjected to sexual violence while in detention, including rape and electric shocks to the genitals. Women, in particular, were subjected to brutal gendered violence, including being forced to ingest the urine of their captors and having their genitals and breasts mutilated. Myriad instances of torture and rape, with victims including girls younger than 13, were reported to Amnesty International. Those released were often placed under house arrest, had to report to the military regularly, or were banned from Government employment, as were their children.

Aftermath

Impact 
Sukarno's balancing act of "Nasakom" (nationalism, religion, communism) had been unravelled. His most significant pillar of support, the PKI, had been effectively eliminated by the other two pillars—the Army and political Islam; and the Army was on the way to unchallenged power. Many Muslims were no longer trusting of Sukarno, and by early 1966, Suharto began to defy Sukarno openly, a policy that Army leaders had previously avoided. Sukarno attempted to cling to power and mitigate the Army's new-found influence, although he could not bring himself to blame the PKI for the coup as demanded by Suharto. On 1 February 1966, Sukarno promoted Suharto to the rank of lieutenant general. The Supersemar decree of 11 March 1966 transferred much of Sukarno's power over the parliament and Army to Suharto, ostensibly allowing Suharto to do whatever was needed to restore order. On 12 March 1967, Sukarno was stripped of his remaining power by Indonesia's provisional parliament, and Suharto named Acting President. On 21 March 1968, the Provisional People's Consultative Assembly formally elected Suharto as president.

Several hundred or thousand Indonesian leftists travelling abroad were unable to return to their homeland. For example, Djawoto, the ambassador to China, refused to be recalled and spent the rest of his life outside of Indonesia. Some of these exiles, writers by trade, continued writing. This Indonesian exile literature was full of hatred for the new government and written simply, for general consumption, but necessarily published internationally.

In late 1968, the National Intelligence Estimate for Indonesia reported: "An essential part of the Suharto government's economic program ... has been to welcome foreign capital back to Indonesia. Already about 25 American and European firms have recovered control of mines, estates, and other enterprises nationalized under Sukarno. Liberal legislation has been enacted to attract new private foreign investment. ... There is substantial foreign investment in relatively untapped resources of nickel, copper, bauxite, and timber. The most promising industry ... is oil."
The killings served as a direct precedent for the genocidal invasion and occupation of East Timor. The same generals oversaw the killing in both situations and encouraged equally brutal methods—with impunity.

The killings in Indonesia were so effective and enjoyed such prestige among Western powers that they inspired similar anti-communist purges in countries such as Chile and Brazil. Vincent Bevins found evidence that indirectly linked the metaphor "Jakarta" to eleven countries.

Global reaction 
To Western governments, the killings and purges were seen as victory over communism at the height of the Cold War. Western governments and much of the West's media preferred Suharto and the "New Order" to the PKI and the increasingly leftist "Old Order". The British ambassador, Andrew Gilchrist, wrote to London: "I never concealed from you my belief that a little shooting in Indonesia would be an essential preliminary to effective change." News of the massacre was carefully controlled by Western intelligence agencies. Journalists, prevented from entering Indonesia, relied on the official statements from Western embassies. The British embassy in Jakarta advised intelligence headquarters in Singapore on how the news should be presented: "Suitable propaganda themes might be: PKI brutality in murdering Generals, ... PKI subverting Indonesia as agents of foreign Communists. ... British participation should be carefully concealed."

A headline in U.S. News & World Report read: "Indonesia: Hope... where there was once none". Australian Prime Minister Harold Holt commented in The New York Times, "With 500,000 to 1 million Communist sympathizers knocked off, I think it is safe to assume a reorientation has taken place." The nationalist oilman H. L. Hunt proclaimed Indonesia the sole bright spot for the United States in the Cold War and called the ouster of Sukarno the "greatest victory for freedom since the last decisive battle of World War II." Time described the suppression of the PKI as "The West's best news for years in Asia," and praised Suharto's regime as "scrupulously constitutional." "It was a triumph for Western propaganda," Robert Challis, a BBC reporter in the area, later reflected. Many Western media reports repeated the Indonesian Army's line by downplaying its responsibility for and the rational, organised nature of the mass killing. They emphasised the role of civilians instead, invoking the orientalist stereotype of Indonesians as primitive and violent. A New York Times journalist wrote an article titled "When a Nation Runs Amok" explaining that the killings were hardly surprising since they occurred in "violent Asia, where life is cheap."

U.S government officials were "almost uniformly celebratory" of the mass killings. In recalling their attitudes regarding the killings, State Department intelligence officer Howard Federspiel said that "no one cared, as long as they were Communists, that they were being butchered." Within the United States, Robert F. Kennedy was one of the only prominent individuals to condemn the massacres. He said in January 1966: "We have spoken out against the inhuman slaughters perpetrated by the Nazis and the Communists. But will we speak out also against the inhuman slaughter in Indonesia, where over 100,000 alleged Communists have not been perpetrators, but victims?" U.S. economic elites were also pleased with the outcome in Indonesia. Following Suharto's consolidation of power in 1967, many companies, including Freeport Sulphur (see Grasberg mine), Goodyear Tire and Rubber Company, General Electric, American Express, Caterpillar Inc., StarKist, Raytheon Technologies and Lockheed Martin, went to explore business opportunities in the country.

USSR's Andrei Sakharov called the killings a 'tragic event' and described it as "an extreme case of reaction, racism and militarism", but otherwise, the Soviet response was relatively muted. It was likely in response to the PKI siding with China in the Sino-Soviet split. Other Communist states issued sharp criticism of the killings. The Chinese government stated they were "heinous and diabolical crimes ... unprecedented in history." China also offered refuge to Indonesian leftists fleeing the violence. One Yugoslav diplomat commented that "even assuming the guilt of the politburo [PKI leadership], which I do not, does this justify genocide? Kill the Central Committee, but do not kill 100,000 people who do not know and had no part in it [the 30 September Plot]." The killings perhaps provided a justification for the Cultural Revolution in China, as Chinese communist leaders were fearful that "hidden bourgeois elements" could infiltrate or destroy leftist movements and organisations, and it was built around this narrative. The Suharto government was condemned as a "military fascist regime" by the government of North Korea.

The United Nations avoided commenting on the killings. When Suharto returned Indonesia to the UN, the People's Socialist Republic of Albania was the only member state to protest.

Foreign involvement 

At the time of the killings, the Cold War between Western powers, in particular the United States, and the communist powers, was at its height. The U.S. government and the rest of the Western Bloc had the goal of halting the spread of communism and bringing countries into its sphere of influence; the eradication of the PKI and Suharto's taking power would be a major turning point in the Cold War. The United Kingdom had an additional, direct, motive to want Sukarno out of power: he opposed the Malayan federation, formed from former states  of British Malaya neighbouring Indonesia; since 1963 there had been conflict and armed incursions by the Indonesian army across the border, following communist insurgency from 1948 to 1960 in British Malaya and then independent Commonwealth member Malaya.

Geoffrey B. Robinson, professor of history at UCLA, posits that, based on documentary evidence, powerful foreign states, in particular the United States, Great Britain and their allies, were instrumental in facilitating and encouraging the Indonesian Army's campaign of mass killing, and without such support, the killings would not have happened. He elaborates in his 2018 book The Killing Season:

While the exact role of the U.S. government during the massacres remains obscured by still-sealed government archives on Indonesia for this period, it is known that "at a minimum," the U.S. government supplied money and communications equipment to the Indonesian Army that facilitated the mass killings, gave fifty million rupiah to the KAP-Gestapu death squad, and provided targeted names of thousands of alleged PKI leaders to the Indonesian Army. Robert J. Martens, political officer at the U.S. Embassy in Jakarta from 1963 to 1966, told journalist Kathy Kadane in 1990 that he led a group of State Department and CIA officials who drew up the lists of roughly 5,000 Communist Party operatives, which he provided to an Army intermediary. Kadane asserts that approval for the release of names came from top U.S. Embassy officials, including U.S. Ambassador to Indonesia Marshall Green, deputy chief of mission Jack Lydman and political section chief Edward Masters, who all later denied involvement. Martens claimed he acted without approval to avoid red tape at a critical time. The State Department volume Foreign Relations of the United States, 1964–1968, which the CIA attempted to suppress in 2001, acknowledges that the U.S. Embassy provided lists of communist leaders to Indonesians involved in the purges, and notes that Marshall Green stated in a 1966 airgram to Washington, which was drafted by Martens and approved by Masters, that the lists of communists were "apparently being used by Indonesian security authorities who seem to lack even the simplest overt information on PKI leadership." Scholars have also corroborated the claim that U.S. Embassy officials provided lists of communists to Suharto's forces, who, according to Mark Aarons, "ensured that those so named were eliminated in the mass killing operations." Geoffrey B. Robinson asserts that U.S. government officials, among them Marshall Green, "published memoirs and articles that sought to divert attention from any possible U.S. role, while questioning the integrity and political loyalties of scholars who disagreed with them."

Vincent Bevins writes that this was not the first instance of U.S. officials providing lists of suspected communists to members of a foreign government to be rounded up and killed, as they had done so in Guatemala in 1954 and Iraq in 1963. Besides U.S. officials, managers of U.S.-owned corporate plantations also provided the Indonesian Army with lists of "troublesome" communists and union leaders who were subsequently hunted down and killed.

Robert Cribb, writing in 2002, claims "there is considerable evidence that the U.S. encouraged the killings, by both providing funds to anti-communist forces and supplying the Indonesian Army with the names of people whom it believed were PKI members. There is no evidence, however, that U.S. intervention significantly increased the scale of the killings." Vincent Bevins says that the Indonesian military bears "prime responsibility for the massacres and concentration camps," but adds that "Washington was the prime mover" of the operation and "shares guilt for every death." Mark Aarons contends that Marshall Green is "long seen as one of the principal officials involved in encouraging the slaughter." Kai Thaler asserts that declassified documents show that "U.S. officials were accessories to this mass murder" and "helped create the conditions for the killings." Bradley Simpson, Director of the Indonesia/East Timor Documentation Project at the National Security Archive, contends that "Washington did everything in its power to encourage and facilitate the Army-led massacre of alleged PKI members, and U.S. officials worried only that the killing of the party's unarmed supporters might not go far enough, permitting Sukarno to return to power and frustrate the [Johnson] Administration's emerging plans for a post-Sukarno Indonesia." He claims that documents show "the United States was directly involved to the extent that they provided the Indonesian Armed Forces with assistance that they introduced to help facilitate the mass killings," which included the CIA providing small arms from Thailand, and the U.S. government providing monetary assistance and limited amounts of communications equipment, medicine and a range of other items, including shoes and uniforms, to the Indonesian military.

Western support for the Indonesian Army solidified as it demonstrated its "resolve" through the mass killing campaigns. U.S. President Lyndon B. Johnson's National Security Advisor McGeorge Bundy reported to the president that the events since 1 October had been "a striking vindication of U.S. policy towards Indonesia in recent years: a policy of keeping our hand in the game for the long-term stakes despite recurrent pressure to pull out" and that it was made clear to the Indonesian Army via U.S. Embassy's deputy chief of mission, Francis Joseph Galbraith, that "Embassy and the USG generally sympathetic with and admiring of what Army doing." The primary concerns of U.S. officials by December 1965 were that Sukarno had yet to be removed and that plans to nationalise U.S. oil companies had yet to be reversed and warned the emerging Indonesian leadership that Washington would withhold support if threats to U.S. investments were not halted. Professor Ruth Blakeley writes "the case of Indonesia reveals the extent to which the U.S. state prioritised its elite interests over the human rights of hundreds of thousands of Indonesians."

The United States, along with Great Britain and Australia, also played an active role in "black propaganda operations" during the killings, which included clandestine radio broadcasts being transmitted into the country that repeated Indonesian Army propaganda as part of a psychological warfare campaign designed to encourage support for the killings and to discredit the PKI. British Foreign Office documents declassified in 2021 revealed that British propagandists secretly incited anti-communists including army generals to eliminate the PKI, and used black propaganda, due to Sukarno's hostility to the formation of former British colonies into the Malayan federation from 1963. Harold Wilson's government had instructed propaganda specialists from the Foreign Office to send hundreds of inflammatory pamphlets to leading anti-communists in Indonesia, inciting them to kill the foreign minister, Subandrio, and claiming that ethnic Chinese Indonesians deserved the violence meted out to them.

Of all countries, Swedish arms supplies seem to have been the most substantial. According to a report by an Indonesian refugee in Japan, from early December 1965, Indonesia signed "a contract with Sweden for an emergency purchase of $10,000,000 worth of small arms and ammunition to be used for annihilating elements of the PKI." The Swedish Embassy's concerns about the slaughter did grow some months later, with Sweden's ambassador openly critical of the campaign of violence, but apparently after the fact.

Documentary filmmaker Joshua Oppenheimer, director of The Act of Killing (2012) and The Look of Silence (2014), called on the U.S. to account for its role in the killings during a screening of the former for U.S. Congress members. On 10 December 2014, the same day The Look of Silence was released in Indonesia, Senator Tom Udall (D-NM) introduced a "Sense of the Senate Resolution" which condemned the killings and called for the declassification of all documents on U.S. involvement in the events, noting that "the U.S. provided financial and military assistance during this time and later, according to documents released by the State Department."

Declassified documents released by the U.S. Embassy in Jakarta in October 2017 show that the U.S. government had detailed knowledge of the massacres from the start and specifically refer to mass killings ordered by Suharto. The documents also reveal that the U.S. government actively encouraged and facilitated the Indonesian Army's massacres to further its geopolitical interests in the region and that U.S. officials and diplomats at the embassy kept detailed records of which PKI leaders were being killed. U.S. officials, dismayed at Indonesia's shift towards the left, were "ecstatic" over the seizure of power by right-wing generals who proceeded to exterminate the PKI, and were determined to avoid doing anything that might thwart the efforts of the Indonesian Army. The U.S. also withheld credible information which contradicted the Indonesian Army's version of events regarding the abortive coup by junior officers on 30 September 1965, which triggered the killings. On 21 December 1965, the Embassy's first secretary, Mary Vance Trent, sent a cable to the State Department which provided an estimate of 100,000 people killed, and referred to the events as a "fantastic switch which has occurred over 10 short weeks." Bradley Simpson said these previously secret cables, telegrams, letters, and reports "contain damning details that the U.S. was willfully and gleefully pushing for the mass murder of innocent people."

Legacy

Historiography 

Discussion of the killings was heavily tabooed in Indonesia and, if mentioned at all, usually called peristiwa enam lima, the incident of '65. Inside and outside Indonesia, public discussion of the killings increased during the 1990s and especially after 1998 when the New Order government collapsed. Jailed and exiled members of the Sukarno regime, as well as ordinary people, told their stories in increasing numbers. Foreign researchers began to publish increasingly more on the topic, with the end of the military regime and its doctrine of coercing such research attempts into futility.

The killings are skipped over in most Indonesian histories and have been scarcely examined by Indonesians, and has received comparatively little international attention. Indonesian textbooks typically depict the killings as a "patriotic campaign" that resulted in less than 80,000 deaths. In 2004, the textbooks were briefly changed to include the events, but this new curriculum discontinued in 2006 following protests from the military and Islamic groups. The textbooks which mentioned the mass killings were subsequently burnt by order of Indonesia's Attorney General. John Roosa's Pretext for Mass Murder (2006) was initially banned by the Attorney General's Office. The Indonesian parliament set up a truth and reconciliation commission to analyse the killings, but it was suspended by the Indonesian High Court. An academic conference regarding the killings was held in Singapore in 2009. A hesitant search for mass graves by survivors and family members began after 1998, although little has been found. Over three decades later, great enmity remains in Indonesian society over the events.

The Supardjo Document is a copy of the personal notes of General Supardjo regarding the 30 September Movement. It is one of the few primary sources of this event and gives insight into the movement from a military perspective, including Supardjo's opinion on what may have caused the movement to fail.

Satisfactory explanations for the scale and frenzy of the violence have challenged scholars from all ideological perspectives. One view attributes the communal hatreds behind the killings to the forcing of parliamentary democracy onto Indonesian society, claiming that such changes were culturally unsuitable and unnecessarily disruptive in the post-independence 1950s. A contrasting view is that when Sukarno and the military replaced the democratic process with authoritarianism, competing interests—i.e., the Army, political Islam, and Communism—could not be openly debated. They were suppressed instead and could only be expressed through violence. A breakdown in conflict resolution methods led to Muslim groups and the military adopting an "us or them attitude" and when the killings were over, many Indonesians dismissed the event as something the Communists had deserved. The possibility of returning to similar upheavals was cited as a factor in the New Order administration's political conservatism and tight control of the political system. Vigilance against an alleged Communist threat remained a hallmark of Suharto's three-decade presidency.

Although mostly unknown in the West compared to the Vietnam War and various right-wing coups in Latin America, the massacres and Suharto's rise to power are considered by historians to be a significant turning point in the Cold War. The massacres were also crucial to the expansion of capitalism in Indonesia, with Suharto rapidly implementing economic policies that his administration modeled off those of the "Berkeley Mafia", to liberalise the economy. Given U.S. foreign policy goals of stopping the spread of communism and bringing nations into its sphere of influence, the bloody purge which decimated the PKI, the third-largest Communist Party in the world at the time, was considered a huge victory. After viewing declassified documents released in 2017, historian John Roosa notes that much "of the U.S. foreign policy establishment viewed it as a great victory that they were able to sort of 'flip' Indonesia very quickly." He also states that the U.S. did not simply "stand by" and allow the killings to happen, claiming that "it's easy for American commentators to fall into that approach, but the U.S. was part and parcel of the operation, strategising with the Indonesian Army and encouraging them to go after the PKI."

In surveying the most recent histories of the events, along with declassified documents and witness statements, Vincent Bevins posits that the mass killings in mid-1960s Indonesia were not necessarily an isolated incident and serves as the apex of "a loose network of U.S.-backed anti-communist extermination programs" which emerged around the world from 1945 to 1990 (such as Operation Condor), and "carried out mass murder in at least 22 countries." He argues that, unlike the violence unleashed by communist leaders such as Joseph Stalin and Pol Pot, the violence of the anti-communist crusade of the United States has deeply shaped the world we live in today, a "worldwide capitalist order with the United States as its leading military power and center of cultural production." He argues that contrary to the popular notion that much of the developing world peacefully and willingly adopted the capitalist system advocated by the United States and its allies, it's possible that without this violence, "many of these countries would not be capitalist at all."

Geoffrey B. Robinson asserts that while there is no consensus on the matter, some scholars have described the mass killings as "genocide". Jess Melvin claims the 1965–1966 massacre constitutes genocide under the legal definition as particular religious and ethnic groups were targeted collectively for their relations to the PKI. She cites Matthew Lippman and David Nersessian stating atheists are covered under the genocide convention and argues the Indonesian military prescribed the elimination of "atheists" and "unbelievers" collectively for their association with communism and the PKI, and thus these killings would constitute genocide. Melvin also asserts thsy the extermination of the PKI was an act of genocide by pointing out that the PKI themselves identified with a particular religious denomination known as "Red Islam" that mixed Islam with communism. She further argues the killings constitute genocide, rather than politicide, "because the PKI constitute an ideologically-based national group." This interpretation has been rejected by other scholars on the grounds that the United Nations definition of genocide does not mention the targeting of political groups. Historian Charles Coppel argues that the killings were politicide rather than genocide, because the victims "were overwhelmingly Javanese and Balinese, not Chinese".

International People's Tribunal 1965 
In November 2015, the International People's Tribunal on 1965 Crimes Against Humanity in Indonesia, presided over by seven international judges, was held in The Hague, Netherlands. It was formally established in 2014 by human rights activists, academics, and Indonesian exiles in response to an "absence of an official domestic process of transitional justice based on truth finding." In July 2016, chief judge Zak Yacoob publicly read the tribunal's findings, which called the state of Indonesia directly responsible for the events and guilty of crimes against humanity, blamed Suharto for spreading false propaganda and laying the grounds for the massacres, and concluded that the massacres "intended to annihilate a section of the population and could be categorised as genocide"; the report also highlighted other allegations which the panel found to be well-founded, including enslavement in labour camps, ruthless torture, systematic sexual violence, and forced disappearance. Indonesia rejected the tribunal's ruling; Security Minister Luhut Pandjaitan said the killings were "none of their business, they are not our superiors and Indonesia has its own system." The court has no legal authority to issue binding decisions or rulings.

Judge Yacoob stated that "the United States of America, the United Kingdom and Australia were all complicit to differing degrees in the commission of these crimes against humanity." The judges concluded that the U.S. supported the Indonesian military "knowing well that they were embarked upon a programme of mass killings", which included providing lists of alleged communist party officials to the Indonesian security forces with a "strong presumption that these would facilitate the arrest and/or the execution of those that were named", whereas the UK and Australia repeated false propaganda from the Indonesian Army, even after it became "abundantly clear that killings and other crimes against humanity were taking place." Australia's foreign affairs ministry rejected the tribunal's conclusion, which it described as a "human rights NGO", and denies the country was in any way complicit in the killings. The U.S. and the U.K. have not responded to the tribunal's findings. Indonesian human-rights lawyer Nursyahbani Katjasungkana(Indonesian) called on all three countries to admit their complicity, stating that it had been proved from their various diplomatic communications and could no longer be denied.

Films, documentaries, and museums 

During Suharto's regime, the media was heavily influenced and censored to show a 'certain' history of the 1965 incident: a history which purely and undoubtedly blamed the PKI for this political tragedy. However, in recent articles such as by The Jakarta Post, a more in-depth and complex story is recognised by the media offering conflicting views on whom the blame should really fall. A film supporting the New Order's version of events, Pengkhianatan G30S/PKI (Betrayal of Indonesia Communist Party) was broadcast annually on the government television station TVRI every 30 September. This version was the only one allowed in open discourse in the country. After Suharto's removal from power, many people, including those involved, told other versions of the events in various books and films. One, the documentary film The Act of Killing, included interviews with individuals who had participated in the mass killings, and its companion piece The Look of Silence follows one grieving family trying to understand why it happened and exposes how those behind the massacres still revel in their crimes 50 years on, including boasting on camera how they dismembered, eviscerated, castrated and beheaded alleged communists. The film The Year of Living Dangerously, based around events leading up to the killings, internationally released in 1982, was banned in Indonesia until 2000.

A museum called the Museum Pengkhianatan PKI (Komunis), the "Museum of Communist Betrayal", was established in Jakarta to buttress the narrative that the PKI were traitors and deserved to be eradicated.

Books and novels 
The killings inspired many novelists to write their own rendition of the event, either on a more local, socio-cultural level, or on a national, political level. Books that were written in Indonesia during 	the New Order often faced censorship of certain concepts, while books written and published abroad were banned from the country.

John Roosa's Pretext for Mass Murder traces a historical path through the 1965 event, painting a scenario of explanations for what preceded, caused and followed the coup. It focuses on several aspects of the coup such as the incoherence of facts and the incompetence of coup organisers to provide four main interpretations of the coup:(1) the movement as an attempted coup d'état by the PKI, (2) the movement as a mutiny of junior officers, (3) the movement as an alliance of Army officers and the PKI, and (4) the movement as a frame-up of the PKI. It also looks at material previously left unexplored in traditional discussions of the incident to give a reconstruction of the chaos that surrounds this period in Indonesian history.

Ahmad Tohari's trilogy novel The Dancer (Ronggeng Dukuh Paruk) depicts a village community caught in a revolution, giving readers a perspective less acknowledged in the more popular account of the massacres. By having its two main characters, Srintil and Rasus, on opposite ends of the revolution, the novel sketches not only the circumstances that could have drawn the greater rural public into communist practices but also the mindset of the people who were tasked with carrying out the killings. As the novel was published in 1981, certain aspects were censored by the New Order, but all the same, the trilogy provides valuable insight into the grass-root level of the anti-communist coup and the tragedies that followed.

Eka Kurniawan's Beauty is a Wound (2002) weaves history into satire, tragedy and the supernatural to depict the state of the nation before, during and after 1965. There is less focus on the military aspect of the coup, but a good deal of focus on the communists themselves through the form of interpersonal relationships and communist ghosts who could not find peace. Without meaning to, perhaps, the novel also gives readers a glimpse of the economy of Indonesia at the time using the example of a flourishing prostitute business and a temporary swimsuit business, among others. Kurniawan projects his feelings about the revolution and coup by constructing a story of theatrical characters around it and delivers a history of the nation all the way from Dutch occupation to Suharto.

Louise Doughty's Black Water (2016) deals with the 1965 event by exploring them from a European viewpoint. Shifting between California and Indonesia as settings for the novel, the book is written from the perspective of a single man working as an operative for an international company. The novel focuses more on foreign reactions to the coup rather than the coup itself, especially from the foreign journalist community.

The Jakarta Method (2020) by Vincent Bevins builds upon his writing for The Washington Post employing recently declassified records, archival probes, and primary eye-witness interviews gathered from one dozen countries to further examine and bring to greater public acknowledgement of the legacy of the killings.

See also 
 1740 Batavia massacre
 1918 Kudus riot
 40 Years of Silence: An Indonesian Tragedy, a 2009 documentary film
 Anti-communist mass killings
 Banjarmasin riot of May 1997
 Communism in Sumatra
 Gerwani
 Human rights in Indonesia
 Indonesian occupation of East Timor
 List of massacres in Indonesia
 May 1998 riots of Indonesia
 Mergosono massacre (1947)
 Petrus killings
 Politicide
 United States and state terrorism
 United States involvement in regime change

Notes

References and further reading

 
 
 Bellamy, Alex J. (2012). Massacres and Morality: Mass Atrocities in an Age of Civilian Immunity. Oxford University Press. .
 
 Blakeley, Ruth (2009).  State Terrorism and Neoliberalism: The North in the South. Routledge. 
 Blumenthal, David A. and McCormack, Timothy L. H. (2007). The Legacy of Nuremberg: Civilising Influence or Institutionalised Vengeance? (International Humanitarian Law). Martinus Nijhoff Publishers. 
 Crouch, Harold (1978). The army and politics in Indonesia, Ithaca, N.Y.: Cornell University Press  (A revision of the author's thesis, Monash University, Melbourne, 1975, entitled: The Indonesia Army in politics, 1960–1971.)  pp. 65–66. Cited in Cribb (1990).
 
 
 
 
 
 Hindley, Donald. The Communist Party of Indonesia, 1951–1963 (U of California Press, 1966).
 
 
 Mehr, Nathaniel (2009). Constructive Bloodbath in Indonesia: The United States, Great Britain and the Mass Killings of 1965–1966. Spokesman Books. 
 
 Oey Hong Lee, (1971) Indonesian government and press during Guided Democracy Hull: University of Hull, Hull monographs on South-East Asia; no. 4 . Zug, Switzerland : Inter Documentation Co.
 
  cited here from Friend (2003).
 

 
 
 
 Simpson, Bradley (2010). Economists with Guns: Authoritarian Development and U.S.–Indonesian Relations, 1960–1968. Stanford University Press. 
 
 
 
 Vickers, Adrian (1995), From

External links 
 Final Report of the IPT 1965: Findings and Documents of the IPT 1965. International People's Tribunal 1965.
 Suharto’s Purge, Indonesia’s Silence. Joshua Oppenheimer for The New York Times, 29 September 2015.
 Indonesia takes step toward reckoning with '65–66 atrocities . The Associated Press. 18 April 2016
 Indonesia challenged to admit existence of mass graves from anti-communist purges. Australian Broadcasting Corporation. 23 May 2016.
 Indonesia Takes a Step Back From Reckoning With a Past Atrocity. The New York Times, 29 September 2017.
 In Indonesia, the ‘fake news’ that fueled a Cold War massacre is still potent five decades later. The Washington Post. 30 September 2017.
 There’s now proof that Soeharto orchestrated the 1965 killings by Jess Melvin. Indonesia at Melbourne at the University of Melbourne, 26 June 2018.
 LIFE Magazine article, 1 July 1966

 
Massacres in 1965
Cold War conflicts
Transition to the New Order
Political and cultural purges
Suharto
Massacres in Indonesia
1965 in Indonesia
1966 in Indonesia
History of Bali
History of Sumatra
History of Java
Mass murder in 1966
Communist Party of Indonesia
Anti-communism in Indonesia
Anti-communist terrorism
Persecution of atheists
Politicides
Anti-Chinese sentiment in Indonesia
Chinese diaspora in Indonesia
Human rights abuses in Indonesia
Anti-Chinese sentiment in Asia